Girolamo Seripando (Troja, Apulia, 6 May 1493 – Trento, 17 March 1563) was an Augustinian friar, Italian theologian and cardinal.

Life
He was of noble birth, and intended by his parents for the legal profession. After their death, however, at the age of fourteen, he entered the Augustinian Order, at Viterbo, where he studied of Greek and Hebrew as well as philosophy and theology. 

After a short stay in Rome, where he had been called by his superior general, he was appointed lecturer at Siena (1515), professor of theology at Bologna (1517), and vicar-general (1532), a role he filled with great credit for two years. He won such a reputation for eloquence by his discourses in the principal cities of Italy, that the Emperor Charles V often made it a point to be present at his sermons. 

Elected superior general in 1539, he governed for twelve years, with singular prudence, zeal, and piety. In 1546, he attended the sessions of the Council of Trent, where he distinguished himself by his zeal for the purity of the text of Holy Writ, and also by his views concerning original sin and justification that council fathers felt were more in line with Lutheran view. 

Pope Paul III sent him as his legate to the emperor and to the King of France, after which he was offered the Bishopric of Aquila. Seripando not only declined this dignity, but even resigned his position as superior general (1551), and withdrew into a small convent. He was called from this retirement (1553) on a mission from the city of Naples to Charles V. Upon completion of this he was appointed Archbishop of Salerno. He proved a zealous and efficient pastor. 

A few years later (1561), Pope Pius IV made him cardinal and second legate of the Holy See at the Council of Trent. Upon the death of Cardinal Gonzaga, he became first president of the same Council.

Works
Seripando was an elegant and prolific writer, and a vigorous controversialist, rather than an orator. The following are his principal published works: "Novae constitutiones ordinis S. Augustini" (Venice, 1549); "Oratio in funere Caroli V imperatoris" (Naples, 1559); "Prediche sopra il simbolo degli Apostoli, etc." (Venice, 1567); "Commentarius in D. Pauli epistolas ad Galatas" (Venice, 1569); "Commentaria in D. Pauli epistolas ad Romanos et ad Galatas" (Naples, 1601); "De arte orandi" (Lyons, 1670); and several of his letters, included by Lagomarsini in "Poggiani epist. et orationes" (Rome, 1762).

References

Sources
 Ellies Dupin, Hist. de l'eglise (Paris, 1703)
 Raynald-Mansi, Annal. eccl. (Lucca, 1735-6)
 Ossinger, Bibl. August. (Ingolstadt, 1768)
 
 
Abbondanza, Rocchina (1982). Girolamo Seripando tra Evangelismo e Riforma Cattolica. . Naples: Editrice Ferraro 1982.
Cesareo, Francesco C. (1999). A Shepherd in Their Midst: The Episcopacy of Girolamo Seripando (1554-1563). Augustinian Press, 1999.
Jedin, Hubert (1947). Papal Legate at the Council of Trent: Cardinal Seripando. trans. Frederic C. Eckhoff (St. Louis: B. Herder, 1947).
Olivier, D. (1968). "Les deux sermons sur la double et la triple justice," . Öcumenica 3 (1968), pp. 39–69.
Schmitz, Edwin F. (1955). Girolamo Seripando and Justification at the Council of Trent. St. Mary's Seminary (Baltimore, Md.), 1955.

1493 births
1563 deaths
Augustinian friars
16th-century Italian cardinals
Participants in the Council of Trent
16th-century Italian Roman Catholic archbishops